Tamara Milosevic (born 1976) is a German documentary filmmaker of Serbian descent.

Life and work
Tamara Milosevic was born in Frankfurt am Main. In 2000, she began studying at the Film Academy Baden-Wuerttemberg. At first she focused on animation, but then switched to documentary filmmaking, graduating in 2005.  That same year, Milosevic came out with her documentary Wrong Time, Wrong Place which won two awards. The film focuses on an unsolved murder in Germany. Her 2008 documentary El futuro del ayer takes a look at everyday life in Cuba. Shot in 2009, the film Überall nur nicht hier examines a town in post war Bosnia.

Filmography (selection)
2003: Cement
2005: Wrong Time, Wrong Place (Zur falschen Zeit am falschen Ort)
2008: El futuro del ayer
2009: Überall nur nicht hier

Awards and nominations
Cement (2003)
2004: Golden Black Box Award for Best Documentary
Wrong Time, Wrong Place (2005)
2005: International Leipzig Festival for Documentary and Animated Film - CinemaNet Europe Award
2006: German Television Awards - Promotional Award

References

External links
 
 Official website (German)

1976 births
Living people
German women film directors
Film directors from Frankfurt
German people of Serbian descent
German documentary film directors
Women documentary filmmakers